The 2015 Asian Baseball Cup was an international baseball tournament contested by the men's national teams of WBSC Asia's member associations. It was the 12th edition of the biannual Asian Baseball Cup, and served as qualification to the 2015 Asian Baseball Championship. It was divided into two separate divisions, East and West, alternatively called the 2015 East Asian Baseball Cup and 2015 West Asian Baseball Cup.

The Eastern Division of the tournament was hosted in Jakarta, Indonesia from 3–8 May 2015, while the Western Division was hosted in Islamabad, Pakistan from 23–28 February 2015.

Participants

Eastern Division

 (host)

Western Division
 
 
 
 (host)

Eastern Division

Preliminary round

NOTE: Tiebreaker notes: HTH − Head-to-head. RS − Runs scored. IPO − Innings the team batted. RA − Runs against. IPD − Innings the team pitched. TQB − The index of (RS/IPO)−(RA/IPD).

Final

Awards

Western Division

Awards

References

External links
Eastern Division results
Western Division results

Asian Baseball Championship
International baseball competitions hosted by Indonesia
International baseball competitions hosted by Pakistan
2015
2015 in Indonesian sport
2015 in Pakistani sport
February 2015 sports events in Pakistan
May 2015 sports events in Asia
Sports competitions in Islamabad
Sports competitions in Jakarta